Hazel station may refer to:

Hazel station, a light rail station in Sacramento, California
Hazel Crest station, a commuter rail station in Hazel Crest, Illinois
Hazel Grove railway station, a railway station in Greater Manchester, England
Hazel Grove (Midland) railway station, a former railway station in Cheshire, England